Levista is an Indian brand of coffee produced by SLN Coffee and sold in Karnataka and Tamil Nadu.

History
Levista was launched on 4 December 2017.

See also

 Instant coffee

References

External links
 Official website
 SLN website

Coffee brands
2017 establishments in India
Indian brands